"Breakfast in America" is the title track from English rock band Supertramp's 1979 album of the same name. Credited to Rick Davies and Roger Hodgson, it was a top-ten hit in the UK and a live version of the song reached No. 62 on the Billboard Hot 100 in January 1981. The lyrics tell about a person, presumably British, who dreams of visiting the United States.

Composition 

The inner sleeve of the 1979 Breakfast in America album lists one musician – Roger Hodgson or Rick Davies – as composer for each song. For the "Breakfast in America" title track, Davies alone is listed as composer and lyricist. However, the center label of the 12-inch vinyl disc credits all songs to both Hodgson and Davies. Similarly, on the vinyl single, it was credited to Hodgson and Davies.  

Supertramp started performing the song during a reunion tour without Hodgson, the latter took credit for writing the song, telling reporters that Davies initially "hated" the song, and that he believed Davies did not play on the recording at all. However, in other interviews Hodgson has credited Davies with creating the vocalized retort line, "What's she got? Not a lot."  According to Ultimate Classic Rock critic Nick DeRiso, Hodgson started writing the song as a teenager, and Davies later "helped sharpen the lyrics." Billboard critic Gary Graff agrees with this assessment, including Davies contributing the "What's she got? Not a lot" lyric.

DeRiso describes the lyrics as being about a child dreaming about visiting the United States some day.

Hodgson included the song in his 2010 world tour, produced as a live album titled Classics Live.

In 2005, rap rock band Gym Class Heroes released the hit song "Cupid's Chokehold", which features the chorus from "Breakfast in America".

Reception
Billboard writer David Farrell praised John Helliwell's "Benny Goodman-flavoured clarinet solo."  DeRiso rated it as Supertramp's 9th greatest song.  Graff rated "Breakfast in America" as Supertramp's 5th best song.

Record World predicted that "AOR-pop radio will make sure that [the live version would become] a morning staple," noting Hodgson's "light and lively" vocal performance.

Personnel
Roger Hodgson: lead vocals, piano, pump organ, electric guitar
Rick Davies: harpsichord, synthesizers, vocals
John Helliwell: clarinet
Dougie Thomson: bass
Bob Siebenberg: drums and percussion
Slyde Hyde: trombone, tuba

Charts

Certifications

References

Sources

External links
Supertramp website

Supertramp songs
1979 singles
1979 songs
Music videos directed by Bruce Gowers
Songs written by Rick Davies
A&M Records singles
Songs about the United States